William John Miles (27 August 1871 – 10 January 1942) was an Australian businessman and far-right political activist.

Early life
Miles was born on 27 August 1871 in Woolloomooloo, New South Wales. He was the son of Ellen (née Munton) and John Balfour Clement Miles. His mother, born in England, was the widow of musician William J. Cordner. His father, born in Tahiti, was a public accountant.

Business career
Miles followed his father into the accounting profession, joining the firm of Miles, Vane & Miles (later Yarwood, Vane & Miles). He became a fellow of the Australasian Corporation of Public Accountants and was a long-serving director of Peapes, a menswear store on George Street, Sydney, of which he became the majority shareholder. He retired from business in 1935 on an annual income estimated at £6,000.

In 1913, Miles unsuccessfully sued the Sydney Meat-Preserving Company, of which he was a major shareholder, for its failure to pay dividends. The High Court of Australia ruled against him by 2–1 in the case of Miles v Sydney Meat-Preserving Co Ltd.

Activism
Miles was a secularist. In about 1912 he founded a local branch of England's Rationalist Press Association, which subsequently became the Rationalist Association of New South Wales. In the same year he published a pamphlet titled The Myth of the Resurrection of Jesus, the Christ.

In 1936, Miles established The Publicist, a "a pro-monarchical, pro-fascist, pro-Aboriginal, anti-British, anti-communist and anti-Semitic monthly" with himself as editor. He developed a close relationship with writer P. R. Stephensen, whom he employed as a "literary adviser". He shared Stephensen's nationalist views and published his work The Foundations of Culture in Australia in 1936, which became influential among the Jindyworobak Movement. Miles also published Xavier Herbert's debut novel Capricornia in 1938. He also financed the Aborigines Progressive Association and its related publication The Australian Abo Call.

Personal life
In 1897, Miles married Maria Louisa Binnington, the daughter of a Queensland fishmonger. The couple had two sons and four daughters. He had a tempestuous relationship with his daughter Beatrice, at one point forcing her into the Gladesville Hospital for the Insane.

Miles died on 10 January 1942 at the age of 70.

References

Further reading
 

1871 births
1942 deaths
Australian accountants
Australian publishers (people)
Australian nationalists
Australian magazine editors
Australian magazine publishers (people)